The Posan Line is an electrified freight-only railway line of the Korean State Railway in South P'yŏngan Province, North Korea from Kangsŏ at the junction of the P'yŏngnam and Taean Lines, to Posan.

Services

The April 13 Ironworks at Posan produces pig iron, all of which is shipped to the Ch'ŏllima Steel Complex a short distance away at Kangsŏn on the P'yŏngnam Line, whilst using raw materials received from all over the western part of the country.

Route 

A yellow background in the "Distance" box indicates that section of the line is not electrified.

References

Railway lines in North Korea
Standard gauge railways in North Korea